Giovanna de Oliveira (born 28 August 1992), usually known as Giovanna Oliveira and sometimes simply as Giovanna, is a Brazilian footballer who plays as either a full back or a midfielder.

International career
Giovanna represented Brazil at the 2012 FIFA U-20 Women's World Cup. She made her senior debut in 2019.

Honours
Centro Olímpico
Campeonato Brasileiro de Futebol Feminino: 2013

Ferencváros
Női NB I Third Place: 2014

References

1992 births
Living people
Women's association football fullbacks
Brazilian women's footballers
Brazil women's international footballers
Santos FC (women) players
São José Esporte Clube (women) players
Associação Desportiva Centro Olímpico players
Associação Portuguesa de Desportos players
Ferencvárosi TC (women) footballers
WK League players
Chinese Women's Super League players
Changchun Zhuoyue players
Toppserien players
Avaldsnes IL players
Brazilian expatriate women's footballers
Brazilian expatriate sportspeople in Hungary
Expatriate women's footballers in Hungary
Brazilian expatriate sportspeople in South Korea
Expatriate women's footballers in South Korea
Brazilian expatriate sportspeople in China
Expatriate women's footballers in China
Brazilian expatriate sportspeople in Norway
Expatriate women's footballers in Norway